"Caedite eos. Novit enim Dominus qui sunt eius." is a phrase reportedly spoken by the commander of the Albigensian Crusade, prior to the massacre at Béziers on 22 July 1209. A direct translation of the Medieval Latin phrase is "Kill them. The Lord knows those that are his own". Papal legate and Cistercian abbot Arnaud Amalric was the military commander of the Crusade in its initial phase and leader of this first major military action of the Crusade, the assault on Béziers, and was reported by Caesarius of Heisterbach to have uttered the order.

Less formal English translations have given rise to variants such as "Kill them all; let God sort them out."

Background

Amalric's own version of the siege, described in his letter to Pope Innocent III in August 1209, states:
While discussions were still going on with the barons about the release of those in the city who were deemed to be Catholics, the servants and other persons of low rank and unarmed attacked the city without waiting for orders from their leaders. To our amazement, crying "to arms, to arms!", within the space of two or three hours they crossed the ditches and the walls and Béziers was taken. Our men spared no one, irrespective of rank, sex or age, and put to the sword almost 20,000 people. After this great slaughter the whole city was despoiled and burnt ...

About thirteen years later Caesarius of Heisterbach relates this story about the massacre, with the papal legate quoted using the words :
When they discovered, from the admissions of some of them, that there were Catholics mingled with the heretics they said to the abbot "Sir, what shall we do, for we cannot distinguish between the faithful and the heretics." The abbot, like the others, was afraid that many, in fear of death, would pretend to be Catholics, and after their departure, would return to their heresy, and is said to have replied "Kill them all for the Lord knoweth them that are His" (2 Tim. ii. 19) and so countless number in that town were slain.

Caesarius did not state definitively that this sentence had been uttered, he wrote that Amalric "was reported to have said it" (dixisse fertur in the original text). There is little if any doubt that these words captured the spirit of the assault, and that Arnaud and his crusaders planned to kill the inhabitants of any stronghold that offered resistance. The crusaders (which Arnaud referred to as nostri, "our men") rampaged and killed without restraint. Both Arnaud and Caesarius were Cistercians. Arnaud was the head of the Cistercian Order at the time, and Caeasarius required an imprimatur, so it is unlikely that Arnaud's alleged order as reported by Caesarius was seen at the time as reflecting badly on Arnaud. On the contrary the incident was included as an exemplum in Caeasarius's Book of Miracles because (to Cistercians at least) it reflected well on Arnaud.

Meaning

The Albigensian Crusade was intended to eliminate Catharism, a religious movement denounced by the Catholic Church as heretical. Béziers was not a Cathar stronghold but, according to contemporary Catholic records, home to almost 20,000 baptised Catholics and just over 300 baptised Cathars. Presented with the difficulty of distinguishing Catholics from the Cathars, especially if individuals might misrepresent their own beliefs, the phrase indicated that God would judge those who were killed, and accordingly "sort" them into Heaven or Hell.

The phrase is a partial quotation from the Vulgate version of 2 Timothy 2:19 . In the King James Version, the English translation of the verse is: "Nevertheless the foundation of God standeth sure, having this seal, The Lord knoweth them that are His."

In culture

 The phrase has been adopted by members of the US military in various conflicts, such as the Vietnam War, and is used as an unofficial slogan by certain units. In parts of the War on Terror, the variant "Kill them all. Let Allah sort them out" has been used.
 In the video game Duke Nukem 3D, the character uses the latter half of this expression after killing aliens.
 In The Simpsons episode "The Boy Who Knew Too Much", Bart is concerned an innocent person may go to jail and confides in Marge. In an attempt to assuage Bart's concern, Marge says, "Well, Bart, your Uncle Arthur used to have a saying, 'Shoot 'em all and let God sort 'em out.' Unfortunately, one day he put his theory in to practice. It took 75 federal marshals to bring him down. Now let's never speak of him again."
 In Midnight Mass episode 6, this phrase is alluded to when discussing an imminent danger to the townspeople. Bev Keane says, "those who've been coming to church and taking communion–they have nothing to fear tonight. As for the rest of them, let God sort them out."
 In Altered Carbon Season 2 episode 3, this sentence is spoken by Colonel Carrera.
 On the Marilyn Manson album Antichrist Superstar, the song "The Reflecting God" features the lyrics "Let's just kill everyone, and let your God sort them out!"

See also

 List of Latin phrases
 No quarter
 Salting the earth

References

1209 in Europe
1200s in France
Albigensian Crusade
Latin words and phrases
Quotations from religion
Quotations from military
13th-century neologisms
13th-century Christianity